Buprestites is a fossil genus of beetles in the family Buprestidae, containing the following species:

 Buprestites agriloides Heer, 1862
 Buprestites alutacea (Germar, 1837)
 Buprestites carbonum (Germar, 1837)
 Buprestites debilis Heer, 1860
 Buprestites exstinctus Heer, 1847
 Buprestites falconeri Heer, 1862
 Buprestites heeri Scudder, 1900
 Buprestites major (Germar, 1837)
 Buprestites minnae Giebel, 1856
 Buprestites oeningensis Heer, 1847
 Buprestites purbecensis Cockerell, 1920
 Buprestites viridis Meunier, 1898
 Buprestites xylographica (Germar, 1849)

References

Buprestidae genera